The 40th Annual TV Week Logie Awards was held on Sunday 19 April 1998 at the Crown Palladium in Melbourne, and broadcast on the Nine Network. The ceremony was hosted by Daryl Somers, and guests included Matt LeBlanc, Kathy Najimy, Kenny Rogers and Reba McEntire.

Winners and nominees
In the tables below, winners are listed first and highlighted in bold.

Gold Logie

Acting

Most Popular Programs

Most Outstanding Programs

Hall of Fame
After a lifetime in Australian television, Graham Kennedy became the 15th inductee into the TV Week Logies Hall of Fame. However, Bert Newton accepted the award on his behalf.

References

External links
 

1998
1998 television awards
1998 in Australian television